Jambi United Football Club (simply known as JUFC or Jambi United) is an Indonesian football club based in Jambi (city), Jambi. They currently compete in the Liga 3 and their homeground is Tri Lomba Juang KONI Stadium.

History
Jambi United was established by Arie Dwi Debrata in 2018. Arie Dwi Debrata as one of the owners of Jambi United said that the establishment of the club aims to be a forum for young players from Jambi to be able to develop talent and increase opportunities to appear in the top caste of national football. Even though it is a new club, Jambi United's name has started to steal attention, especially in a number of social media, not about achievements, but the courage of the club owner who uses a logo similar to the Serie A club, Juventus, as the club's pride logo, he was inspired by Juventus in building the club, it was even acknowledged that the founders of the club were all La Vecchia Signora fans.

Players

Current squad

Honours
 Liga 3 Jambi
 Champion: 2021

References

External links
Jambi United Instagram

Football clubs in Indonesia
Football clubs in Jambi
Association football clubs established in 2018
2018 establishments in Indonesia